Ivan Morley (born 1966, Burbank, California, United States) is an artist based in Los Angeles.

Morley's work has been exhibited in a number of exhibitions including at Lemon Sky Project Space in Hollywood, the Contemporary Arts Collective in Las Vegas and at Galerie Tanit in Munich.  He has also shown at museums and galleries such as the Los Angeles Museum of Contemporary Art, the Kunstsammlung Nordrhein-Westfalen in Düsseldorf and the Bernier/Eliades in Athens.

Ivan Morley can loosely be described as a painter, although he uses a wide variety of media and surfaces.

External links

1966 births
Living people
American artists